Sivkovo may refer to:

 Sivkovo, Vereshchaginsky District
 Sivkovo, Vladimir Oblast